Ecsenius monoculus is a species of combtooth blenny in the genus Ecsenius. It is found in coral reefs in the western Pacific ocean, around Indonesia and the Philippines. It can reach a maximum length of 5 centimetres. Blennies in this species feed primarily off of plants, including benthic algae and weeds.

References

monoculus
Fish described in 1988
Taxa named by Victor G. Springer